Nicolas LeRoy (born 16 September 1888, date of death unknown) was a Belgian equestrian. He competed in two events at the 1924 Summer Olympics.

References

External links
 

1888 births
Year of death missing
Belgian male equestrians
Olympic equestrians of Belgium
Equestrians at the 1924 Summer Olympics
Place of birth missing